The Beach Handball World Games tournaments were first contested in the first World Beach Games event in Qatar, Doha.

Men's tournament

History

Men's medals summary

Women's tournament

History

Women's medals summary

References

External link
Results book

Recurring sporting events established in 2019
World Beach Games
Sports at the World Beach Games